Jordan Thompson (born ) is a professional rugby league footballer who plays as a  or  for the York Knights in the Betfred Championship. 

He has previously played for the Castleford Tigers (Heritage № 901) in the Super League, and on loan from Castleford at the York City Knights in the Championship. Thompson has also played for  Hull FC, in two separate spells and the Leeds Rhinos in the Super League. He has also previously played for Leigh in the Betfred Championship.

Background
Thompson was born in Normanton, West Yorkshire, England.

Early career
He signed for the club form local amateur side Normanton Knights.

First team appearances

Castleford Tigers
Thompson made his first-team début in a 50–10 loss to St Helens in round 16 of 2009's Super League XIV, where he came on off the bench. Since this, he made his maiden start for the club in a 40–38 win at Bradford where he scored a try playing on the wing.

Jordan has made a steady start to life in the Castleford first team and has filled in at full back, wing and centre and acquitted himself well. Jordan signed a new contract until the end of the 2013 season in July 2011.

Hull FC
Jordan signed a 3-year contract with Super League club Hull F.C. in September 2013 and has been a regular in the squad all through 2014 & 2015.

Leigh Centurions
In October 2017 he joined Leigh on a 2-year deal.

York RLFC
On 18 October 2021, it was reported that he had signed for York RLFC in the RFL Championship

References

External links

Leigh Centurions profile
SL profile

1991 births
Living people
Castleford Tigers players
Hull F.C. players
Leeds Rhinos players
Leigh Leopards players
Rugby league fullbacks
Rugby league wingers
York City Knights players